Peoples Township is one of seventeen townships in Boone County, Iowa, USA.  As of the 2000 census, its population was 346.

History
Peoples Township was established in 1871. It was named for David Peoples, an early settler.

Geography
According to the USGS, it contains two cemeteries: Peoples and Peoples.

References

External links
 US-Counties.com
 City-Data.com

Townships in Boone County, Iowa
Townships in Iowa
1871 establishments in Iowa